Salvia ekimiana is a perennial plant that is endemic to Central Anatolia in Turkey, growing in open pine forest and alpine steppe at  elevation.

The corolla is white with a lilac hood, and with a greyish calyx with a violet stripe. The specific epithet honors professor Tuna Ekim, a Turkish botanist.

Notes

ekimiana
Flora of Turkey